Arthur "Toto" Rivera Defensor Jr. (born October 8, 1969) is a Filipino politician who served as the 32nd Governor of Iloilo since 2019. He is formerly as the member of the 15th, 16th and 17th Congress of House of Representatives of the Philippines for Third District from 2010 to 2019.

Defensor Jr. is the son of former governor and congressman, Arthur Defensor Sr.

References

External links
Province of Iloilo (Official Website)

|-

Living people
Governors of Iloilo
PDP–Laban politicians
Members of the House of Representatives of the Philippines from Iloilo
People from Iloilo City
1969 births